The year 2016 is the 16th year in the history of the Wu Lin Feng, a Chinese kickboxing promotion. Events are broadcast on Henan Television every Saturday 21:15.

List of events

Wu Lin Feng 2016: World Kickboxing Championship in Shanghai

Wu Lin Feng 2016: World Kickboxing Championship in Shanghai was a kickboxing event held on January 23, 2016 in Shanghai, China.

Results

Wu Lin Feng 2016: WFL x Fight League - China vs Morocco

Wu Lin Feng 2016: WFL x Fight League - China vs Morocco was a kickboxing event held on Ausgut 04, 2016 in Tangier, Morocco.

Results

Wu Lin Feng 2016: China vs Australia

Wu Lin Feng 2016: China vs Australia was a kickboxing event held on Ausgut 27, 2016 in Sydney, Australia.

Results

Wu Lin Feng 2016: Netherlands VS China

Wu Lin Feng 2016: Netherlands VS China was a kickboxing event held on September 03, 2016 in Zhengzhou, China.

Results

Wu Lin Feng 2016: World Kickboxing Championship in Shenzhen

Wu Lin Feng 2016: World Kickboxing Championship in Shenzhen was a kickboxing event held on September 10, 2016 in Shenzhen, China.

Results

Wu Lin Feng 2016: WLF x KF1

Wu Lin Feng 2016: WLF x KF1 was a kickboxing event held on October 14, 2016 in Hong Kong.

Results

Wu Lin Feng 2016: WLF x KO Fighters Series 2 - China vs Spain

Wu Lin Feng 2016: WLF x KO Fighters Series 2 - China vs Spain was a kickboxing event held on October 29, 2016 in Marbella, Spain.

Results

Wu Lin Feng 2016: Fight of the Century 2

Wu Lin Feng 2016: Fight of the Century 2 was a kickboxing event held on November 05, 2016 in Zhengzhou, China.

Results

Wu Lin Feng 2016: China vs USA

Wu Lin Feng 2016: China vs USA was a kickboxing event held on November 17, 2016 in Las Vegas.

Results

Wu Lin Feng 2016: WLF x Krush - China vs Japan

Wu Lin Feng 2016: WLF x Krush - China vs Japan was a kickboxing event held on December 03, 2016 in Zhengzhou, China.

Results

Wu Lin Feng 2016: WLF x Mix Fight Gala 20 - China vs Europe

Wu Lin Feng 2016: WLF x Mix Fight Gala 20 - China vs Europe was a kickboxing event held on December 03, 2016 in Frankfurt, Germany.

Results

See also
2016 in Glory
2016 in K-1
2016 in Glory of Heroes
2016 in Kunlun Fight

References

2016 in kickboxing
Kickboxing in China